Hardwick Wood is a  biological Site of Special Scientific Interest southwest of Hardwick in Cambridgeshire. It is managed by the Wildlife Trust for Bedfordshire, Cambridgeshire and Northamptonshire.

This medieval wood is now managed by coppicing. It is mainly ash and field maple, while the oldest parts have pedunculate oak with an understorey of hazel and hawthorn, while ground flora include early-purple orchid and yellow archangel. There are birds such as willow warblers, marsh tits and blackcaps.

There is access by footpath.

References

Sites of Special Scientific Interest in Cambridgeshire
Wildlife Trust for Bedfordshire, Cambridgeshire and Northamptonshire reserves